Ofer Sachs (born 1972, Israel) was the Israeli Ambassador to Italy (concurrently serving to FAO, WFP & IFAD and San Marino).  He was replaced on September 2, 2019 by Dror Eydar.

He was the General Manager of the Israeli Export & International Cooperation Institute (IEICI) for four years before becoming Ambassador. Sachs has been CEO of Herzog Strategic since October 2019.

Sachs earned a B.Sc. in Natural Sciences and a M.Sc. in Economics from the Hebrew University of Jerusalem.

References

External links
In Political Switcheroo, Netanyahu Sends Export Institute Chief to Rome Embassy, Replaces Him With Crony

Ambassadors of Israel to Italy
Ambassadors of Israel to San Marino
Hebrew University of Jerusalem Faculty of Social Sciences alumni
Israeli chief executives
1972 births
Living people